Amarillo Ramp (For Robert Smithson) is a studio album by Sonic Youth's Lee Ranaldo. The album was for Robert Smithson, whose work as an artist was influential on Lee's artwork. "Isolation" is a cover of the John Lennon song.

Track listing 
 "Amarillo Ramp (for Robert Smithson)" – 32:20
 "Non – Site #3" – 6:37
 "Notebook" – 5:02
 "Here" – 5:30
 "Isolation" – 2:54

References

2000 albums
Lee Ranaldo albums